The Bald Hill Creek, a watercourse that is part of the Barwon catchment of the Murray-Darling basin, is located in the Orana region of New South Wales, Australia.

The Bald Hill Creek descends  over its  course.

References

Rivers of New South Wales
Murray-Darling basin